Rudmer Heerema (born 2 February 1978, in Groningen) is a Dutch politician of the People's Party for Freedom and Democracy.

Heerema grew up and worked in Alkmaar, where he worked as a physical exercise teacher and was a city councillor from 2006. On 31 July 2013 Heerema was officially declared a member of the Dutch House of Representatives as the successor of Johan Houwers. He started his term on 3 September 2013. His term in office ended on 23 March 2017. He once again became member on 31 October 2017.

References

1978 births
Living people
21st-century Dutch politicians
Members of the House of Representatives (Netherlands)
Municipal councillors in North Holland
People from Alkmaar
Politicians from Groningen (city)
People's Party for Freedom and Democracy politicians
20th-century Dutch people